Stockholm (known as The Captor in some countries) is a 2018 crime comedy-drama film written, produced and directed by Robert Budreau. It stars Ethan Hawke, Noomi Rapace, Mark Strong, Christopher Heyerdahl, Bea Santos and Thorbjørn Harr. The film premiered at the Tribeca Film Festival on April 19, 2018, and was released on April 12, 2019, by Smith Global Media. The film is loosely based on the true story of the 1973 bank heist and hostage crisis in Stockholm.

Synopsis  
After taking hostages in a Stockholm bank, ex-con Lars Nystrom demands the release of his old partner in crime from prison. As the situation escalates, Lars starts to let down his guard as he develops an uneasy bond with one of the female employees.

Cast 
 Noomi Rapace as Bianca Lind
 Ethan Hawke as Kaj Hansson / Lars Nystrom
 Mark Strong as Gunnar Sorensson
 Christopher Heyerdahl as Chief Mattsson
 Bea Santos as Klara Mardh
 Mark Rendall as Elov Eriksson
 Ian Matthews as Detective Vinter
 John Ralston as Detective Jackobsson
 Shanti Roney as Olof Palme
 Christopher Wagelin as Vincent
 Thorbjørn Harr as Christopher Lind

Production 
On January 27, 2017, it was announced that Noomi Rapace and Ethan Hawke would be starring in Stockholm with Robert Budreau writing, producing and directing the film.

Principal photography on the film began in April 2017.

Reception

Box office
Stockholm grossed $292,590 in the United States and Canada and $399,924 in other territories for a worldwide total of $692,514.

Critical reception
The website's consensus reads, "Stockholm can't quite do justice to its themes or the real-life events it dramatizes, but a light touch and well-chosen cast keep the end results consistently entertaining." On Metacritic, the film holds a rating of 54 out of 100, based on 18 critics, indicating "mixed or average reviews".

Accolades

See also 
 Stockholm syndrome

References

External links 
 
 
 Stockholm at Library and Archives Canada

2010s thriller films
American biographical films
American crime comedy-drama films
American thriller films
American black comedy films
Blumhouse Productions films
Films set in Stockholm
Canadian biographical films
Canadian crime comedy-drama films
Canadian thriller films
Canadian black comedy films
English-language Canadian films
Films based on newspaper and magazine articles
Films directed by Robert Budreau
2010s English-language films
2010s Canadian films
2010s American films